The Sophie Prize was an international environment and development prize (USD 100,000) awarded annually from 1998 to 2013.  It was established in 1997 by the Norwegian author Jostein Gaarder and his wife Siri Dannevig, and is named after Gaarder's novel Sophie's World. It aimed to recognize individuals or organizations working with the environment and sustainable development. In 2013, representatives announced that the prize would not be awarded any longer due to a lack of funds.

Prize winners 

 1998: Environmental Rights Action, Nigeria
 1999: Herman Daly and Thomas Kocherry
 2000: Sheri Liao
 2001: ATTAC France
 2002: Patriarch Bartholomew I
 2003: John Pilger
 2004: Wangari Maathai
 2005: Sheila Watt-Cloutier
 2006: Romina Picolotti
 2007: Göran Persson
 2008: Gretchen Daily
 2009: Marina Silva, Brazil
2010: James Hansen
 2011: Tristram Stuart
 2012: Eva Joly
 2013: Bill McKibben

Board members 
 Åslaug Haga (chair)
 Petter Nome (deputy chair)
 Helene Bank
 Siri Dannevig
 Nikolas Dannevig Gaarder
 Elin Enge
 Thomas Hylland Eriksen
 Jostein Gaarder
 Elizabeth Hartmann
 Dag Olav Hessen
 Bård Lahn
 Ylva Lindberg
 Sidsel Mørck

See also

 List of environmental awards

References

External links 
 Official site

Awards established in 1997
Environmental awards
Norwegian awards